Stronach is an unincorporated community and census-designated place in Stronach Township, Manistee County, Michigan, United States. Its population was 162 as of the 2010 census. The community is located at the southeast end of Lake Manistee.

Geography

Demographics

History
Stronach was first called "Paggeotville" and was renamed when John and Adam Stronach built a sawmill in 1841. A post office opened August 9, 1866 and was discontinued on December 21, 1893. Other sources indicate the post office operated until March 31, 1954 or until December 21, 1983. The area is now served by the Manistee post office with ZIP code 49660.

References

Unincorporated communities in Manistee County, Michigan
Unincorporated communities in Michigan
Census-designated places in Manistee County, Michigan
Census-designated places in Michigan